Including the parasport events, there was a nominal total of 192 quota places available for table tennis at the 2022 Commonwealth Games; 96 each for men and women.

Such was the impact of the COVID-19 pandemic that key competitions (namely Regional Qualifiers and the 2021 Commonwealth Championships) did not take place. As a result, Commonwealth Sport (CGF) and the International Table Tennis Federation (ITTF) decided that where Olympic-style table tennis was concerned, qualification for the Commonwealth Games should primarily be determined by the most recent period in which the pandemic was not a factor in qualifying opportunities, i.e. 2019.

Summary

Table tennis
There are 80 quota places per gender, of which 64 are distributed to 16 teams; the other 16 are awarded to individuals. Each Commonwealth Games Association (CGA) that qualifies a team of 4 players (or 3 if they so choose) may also enter 3 players per singles event and 2 pairs per doubles event (plus a third mixed doubles pair if they qualify a men's and women's team). 

CGAs that qualify individuals (limit of 2 per gender) may enter 2 players per singles event and 1 pair per doubles event (plus a second mixed doubles pair if four individuals qualify).

Timeline

Team qualification
 As the host CGA, England is guaranteed one place in the team event.
 The top eight CGAs on the ITTF World Team Rankings (as of 2 January 2020) earned one place each.
 One CGA from each of the six CGF regions received a CGF/ITTF Bipartite Invitation; determined in lieu of the abandoned Regional Qualifiers.
 The top-ranked CGA not already qualified was given the last place; determined in lieu of the abandoned 2021 Commonwealth Championships.

Men

Women

Note

Singles qualification
 Up to 48 quota places were nominally assigned to players belonging to CGAs already qualified (as above).
 Two players from each of the six CGF regions received a CGF/ITTF Bipartite Invitation; determined in lieu of the abandoned Regional Qualifiers.
 The top two players on the ITTF World Singles Rankings (as of 2 January 2020) earned one place each; determined in lieu of the abandoned 2021 Commonwealth Championships.
 A further two players received Bipartite Invitations.

Men

Women

Doubles qualification
Only those already qualified for team and/or singles events were eligible to enter doubles events (nominally 40 pairs in the men's and women's doubles, 64 pairs in the mixed doubles).

Para table tennis

Timeline

Rules
There are 32 quota places overall. Each Commonwealth Games Association (CGA) may qualify 2 players per event.

 Five places per event are determined by the ITTF Para Table Tennis Rankings List; one for the Americas/Caribbean regions combined, plus one for each of the other four CGF regions.
 Another place per event is determined by the aforementioned rankings directly.
 The last two places in each event are determined by CGF/ITTF Bipartite Invitations.

Men's singles C3–5

Men's singles C8–10

Women's singles C3–5

Women's singles C6–10

References

2019 in table tennis
2021 in table tennis
2022 in table tennis
Table tennis at the 2022 Commonwealth Games
Qualification for the 2022 Commonwealth Games